Paul Cotton (1943–2021) was an American guitarist.

Paul Cotton may also refer to:

Paul Cotton (diplomat) (born 1930), New Zealand's High Commissioner to Tonga from 1975–76